The San Juan Star is an English-language daily newspaper based in San Juan, Puerto Rico. The  Pulitzer Prize-winning newspaper was originally published by Star Media Network, a subdivision of San Juan Star, Inc.

History
The newspaper was founded in 1959 by William J. Dorvillier, and was intended for the English-speaking population in Puerto Rico. Pulitzer Prize-winning novelist William Kennedy was once the managing editor of the Star, soon after its inception to 1961. Other contributors included Eddie López and Juan Manuel García Passalacqua. Scott Ware served as managing editor from 1991 to 1992, then editor until 1994. The paper was sold in 1996 from then owner Scripps-Howard to Gerry Angulo, who had formerly worked for money manager Ivan Boesky.

Demise
On Friday August 29, 2008, The Star published its last issue and closed down with publisher Gerry Angulo because the union did not agree to cost cuts. At the time, the Star had 120 employees. The paper had reportedly been losing money for several years and the losses deepened due to the 2008 recession.

Relaunch
In 2009, The San Juan Star reopened as a weekly with a new staff and a new vision. It has since increased to daily publication: Monday through Thursday with an additional weekend edition. On October 23, 2015, Gerry Angulo died as a result of a car accident.

See also
 List of newspapers in Puerto Rico

References

External links
 Official site

Newspapers established in 1959
 Publications disestablished in 2008
Publications established in 2009
Mass media in San Juan, Puerto Rico
 Newspapers published in Puerto Rico
English-language newspapers published in North America